A cardiotomy is a surgical procedure where an incision is made in the heart. It can be used for suction during heart surgery.

See also 
 List of surgeries by type

References

Cardiac surgery